This is a list of historic places in Eastern Ontario, containing heritage sites listed on the Canadian Register of Historic Places (CRHP), all of which are designated as historic places either locally, provincially, territorially, nationally, or by more than one level of government. There are separate listings for the cities of Kingston and Ottawa.

List of historic places outside Kingston and Ottawa

Frontenac County

Lanark County

Leeds and Grenville United Counties

44.647310, -76.321689

Lennox and Addington County

United Counties of Prescott and Russell

Renfrew County

United Counties of Stormont, Dundas and Glengarry

See also

List of historic places in Ontario
List of National Historic Sites of Canada in Ontario

References

Eastern Ontario